The Men's Pan-American Volleyball Cup is a men's volleyball tournament organized by NORCECA. Initially, only NORCECA teams participated, but CSV teams have been invited since 2010. The event served as a qualifier for World League and the America's Cup. Now, the event serves as an America qualifier for the Pan American Games classification. The women have their own equivalent of the tournament, the Women's Pan-American Cup.

Results

Medal table

Teams by year

MVP by edition
2006 –  Elvis Contreras 
2007 –  José Martell 
2008 –  Evan Patak 
2009 –  Dean Bittner 
2010 –  Jayson Jablonsky 
2011 –  Paulo Victor Silva 
2012 –  Taylor Sander 
2013 –  Ricardo Lucarelli 
2014 –  Rolando Cepeda 
2015 –  Alan Souza 
2016 –  Abrahan Alfonso Gavilán 
2017 –  Martín Ramos 
2018 –  Ezequiel Palacios 
2019 –  Miguel Ángel López
2022 –  Osniel Melgarejo

See also
 Men's Junior Pan-American Volleyball Cup
 Boys' Youth Pan-American Volleyball Cup

References

 NORCECA

 
 
Recurring sporting events established in 2006
International men's volleyball competitions